Potamochoerus (meaning "river pig") is a genus in the pig family (Suidae). The two species are restricted to sub-Saharan Africa, although the bushpig, possibly due to introduction by humans, also occurs in Madagascar and nearby islands. Early in the 20th century, there were considered to be as many as five different species within the genus. These were gradually consolidated, until, in the 1970s, it was generally agreed that all were representatives of just a single species (P. porcus). The bushpig was again recognised as a separate species from about 1993.

The oldest fossils that can be assigned to the genus date from the mid Pliocene in Europe, and are first seen in Africa from least the mid Pleistocene, suggesting that it originally evolved in somewhere in Eurasia. However, molecular phylogenetic evidence suggests that the genus first diverged from the line leading to the giant forest hog and the warthogs much earlier, in the late Miocene, between 11.9 and 5.6 million years ago. The same studies suggest that the two living species diverged from one another between 4.8 and 0.2 million years ago.

Species

Extant species

Fossils
 †Potamochoerus magnus

References

 
Mammal genera
 
 
Taxa named by John Edward Gray
Suinae